Kreminna Raion was a raion (district) in Luhansk Oblast of Eastern Ukraine. The administrative center of the raion was the town of Kreminna. The raion was abolished on 18 July 2020 as part of the administrative reform of Ukraine, which reduced the number of raions of Luhansk Oblast to eight, of which only four were controlled by the government.

Demographics 
As of the 2001 Ukrainian census:

Ethnicity
 Ukrainians: 85.1%
 Russians: 13.5%
 Belarusians: 0.5%

References

Former raions of Luhansk Oblast
1940 establishments in Ukraine
Ukrainian raions abolished during the 2020 administrative reform